Royster may refer to :

Edward Royster (born June 27, 1972) is the lead singer for California metal bands.
Evan Royster (born November 26, 1987) is an American football running back.
Jerry Royster (1952 -) was a third baseman in American baseball.
Linda Royster Beito is chair of the department of social sciences at Stillman College
Ted Royster was a spokesperson for the ATF during the Waco Siege in 1993. 
Tony Royster, Jr. (born October 9, 1984, in Berlin, Germany) is an American drummer .
Vermont C. Royster (1914–1996) was the editor of The Wall Street Journal from 1958 to 1971.